La edad de piedra is a 1964 Mexican comedy film starring Viruta and Capulina.

External links

1964 comedy films
1964 films
Mexican comedy films
1960s Spanish-language films
1960s Mexican films